{{DISPLAYTITLE:C14H21NO}}
The molecular formula C14H21NO may refer to:

 N-Ethylhexedrone (NEH)
 4-Methyl-α-ethylaminopentiophenone (4-MEAP)
 3-PPP
 Profadol (CI-572)
 Zylofuramine

Molecular formulas